Pneumotherapy is the medical use of compressed or rarefied gases, and was at one time used to treat people suffering from pneumothorax (lung collapse).

References

Medical treatments
Pulmonological procedures